Sclerochiton is a genus of plants in the family Acanthaceae.

Species accepted by the Plants of the World Online as of January 2023:

Sclerochiton apiculatus 
Sclerochiton bequaertii 
Sclerochiton boivinii 
Sclerochiton coeruleus 
Sclerochiton glandulosissimus 
Sclerochiton harveyanus 
Sclerochiton hirsutus 
Sclerochiton ilicifolius 
Sclerochiton insignis 
Sclerochiton kirkii 
Sclerochiton nitidus 
Sclerochiton obtusisepalus 
Sclerochiton odoratissimus 
Sclerochiton preussii 
Sclerochiton tanzaniensis 
Sclerochiton triacanthus 
Sclerochiton uluguruensis 
Sclerochiton vogelii

References

Acanthaceae
Acanthaceae genera
Taxonomy articles created by Polbot